Deniz Doğan (born 20 October 1979) is a Turkish-German football coach and football player, who currently works for the reserve team of Eintracht Braunschweig as a playing assistant.

Career

Doğan began his professional at 2. Bundesliga side VfL Osnabrück in 2003. After one season, he transferred to his hometown club VfB Lübeck. After three years in Lübeck, Doğan joined Eintracht Braunschweig in 2007, then playing in the Regionalliga Nord. He went on to play eight seasons for Braunschweig, wearing the number 8. With Braunschweig he won promotion into the 2. Bundesliga in 2011 and into the Bundesliga in 2013. On 10 August 2013, Doğan made his debut in the German first-tier, in a match against SV Werder Bremen.

Doğan retired from professional football at the end of the 2014–15 season. For the 2015–16 Regionalliga season, Doğan joined the staff of Eintracht Braunschweig's reserve team as playing assistant manager. In October 2015, he temporarily returned into the club's first team, which was missing several players due to injuries or suspension at the time.

Personal life

He is the brother of former SV Meppen defender Hüseyin Dogan.

References

External links
 
 

1979 births
Living people
Sportspeople from Lübeck
Footballers from Schleswig-Holstein
Turkish footballers
German twins
German footballers
German people of Turkish descent
Hamburger SV II players
VfL Osnabrück players
VfB Lübeck players
Eintracht Braunschweig players
Eintracht Braunschweig II players
Eintracht Braunschweig non-playing staff
Bundesliga players
2. Bundesliga players
3. Liga players
Regionalliga players
Twin sportspeople
Association football defenders